Fantasy-Faction is a website and community for fans of fantasy fiction. They share news, reviews and interviews about books in the fantasy, science fiction, horror, and other speculative fiction genres.
It was founded by Marc Aplin and has won or been nominated for genre awards including:

 British Fantasy Award Nomination – 2013, 2014, & 2016
 World Fantasy Award Nomination – 2014

References

External links
 

Fantasy fiction websites
British entertainment websites